Ladies' Man is a 1978 novel by Richard Price. Ladies' Man is Price's third novel. The novel was adapted into a 1989 film Sea of Love.

Overview
Kenny Becker, a young door-to-door salesman, goes on the prowl for love in 1970s New York City.

Critical reception
Kirkus Reviews wrote that "what keeps this book afloat long past its torpedoing point is Price's Lenny Bruce-ish, shpritz-style riffery." New York called Ladies' Man "more of a cult book, as it lacks the emotional range and complexity of [Price's] first two novels."

References

1978 American novels
American novels adapted into films
Novels by Richard Price (writer)
Novels set in New York City
Houghton Mifflin books